Matthijs van Nispen (born 29 January 1998) is a Dutch professional footballer who plays as a midfielder for Derde Divisie Saturday club VV DOVO.

Career
After playing youth football for DZC '68, van Nispen joined De Graafschap's academy aged 9. He made his debut for the first team on 20 September 2019 as a late substitute for Branco van den Boomen in a 4–0 win at home to FC Eindhoven.

On 6 July 2020, Van Nispen signed a one-year deal with TOP Oss. After three appearances at the club, he moved to Cypriot Second Division club PAEEK in January 2021. He won the Cypricot Second Division title with the club that season as they were promoted to the Cypriot First Division.

In summer 2021, van Nispen joined Derde Divisie club VV DOVO on a one-year contract. In December 2021, he extended his contract until mid-2024.

Career statistics

References

External links
 
 

1998 births
Living people
People from Doetinchem
Footballers from Gelderland
Association football midfielders
Dutch footballers
DZC '68 players
De Graafschap players
TOP Oss players
Eerste Divisie players
Derde Divisie players
PAEEK players
VV DOVO players
Dutch expatriate footballers
Expatriate footballers in Cyprus
Dutch expatriate sportspeople in Cyprus